{{DISPLAYTITLE:L-Arginine L-pyroglutamate}}

-Arginine -pyroglutamate, also known as pirglutargine and arginine pidolate, is the -arginine salt of pyroglutamic acid. Arginine pyroglutamate is a delivery form of arginine.

Physical and chemical properties 
-Arginine -pyroglutamate is a crystalline solid powder with a sour taste. It is soluble in cold water.

Hazards 
The compound is hazardous if ingested or inhaled in concentrated form. It is slightly hazardous in case of skin and eye contact.

References 

Amino acids
Basic amino acids